Maikaze  was one of 19 s built for the Imperial Japanese Navy during the 1930s.

Design and description
The Kagerō class was an enlarged and improved version of the preceding . Their crew numbered 240 officers and enlisted men. The ships had two Kampon geared steam turbines, each driving one propeller shaft, using steam provided by three Kampon water-tube boilers.

The main armament of the Kagerō class consisted of six Type 3  guns in three twin-gun turrets, one superfiring pair aft and one turret forward of the superstructure. They were built with four Type 96  anti-aircraft guns in two twin-gun mounts, but more of these guns were added over the course of the war. The ships were also armed with eight  torpedo tubes for the oxygen-fueled Type 93 "Long Lance" torpedo in two quadruple traversing mounts; one reload was carried for each tube. Their anti-submarine weapons comprised 16 depth charges.

Construction and career
Maikaze herself was sunk with all hands, including Commander Destroyer Division 4 (Captain Kenma Isohisa).

Notes

References

External links
 CombinedFleet.com: Kagero-class destroyers
 CombinedFleet.com: Maikaze history

Kagerō-class destroyers
World War II destroyers of Japan
World War II shipwrecks in the Pacific Ocean
1941 ships
Ships lost with all hands
Maritime incidents in February 1944
Shipwrecks of the Caroline Islands
Ships built by Fujinagata Shipyards